Syed Hussain Sibt-e-Asghar Naqvi, commonly known as Jaun Elia (14 December 1931 – 8 November 2002), was a Pakistani poet, philosopher, biographer, and scholar. One of the most prominent modern Urdu poets, popular for his unconventional ways, he "acquired knowledge of philosophy, logic, Islamic history, the Muslim Shia tradition, Muslim religious sciences, Western literature, and Kabbala."

Early life 
Jaun Elia was born as Syed Sibt-e-Asghar Naqvi on 14 December 1931 in Amroha, British India. His father, Shafiq Elia, was a scholar of literature and astronomy well-versed in the Arabic, English, Persian, Hebrew and Sanskrit languages, and who corresponded with leading intellectuals like Bertrand Russell. He was the youngest of his siblings. Rais Amrohvi was his elder brother. Indian film director Kamal Amrohi was his first cousin.

Described as a child prodigy, he was initially educated at the Syed-ul-Madaris in Amroha.

Being a communist, Elia opposed the partition of India. Elia once remarked on the creation of Pakistan that "this was the mischief of boys from Aligarh". However, he eventually migrated to Pakistan in 1957, and decided to live in Karachi. Poet Pirzada Qasim said:

He began writing poetry at the age of 8 but published his first collection, Shayad, when he was 60. He was inspired by the philosophy of Islam.

He married writer Zahida Hina in 1970. They separated in 1992.

Works

Poetry collections 
Sukhan Meri Udasee Hai
Zakham-e-Umeed – زخمِ امید
Mubada
Tumharey Aur Mere Darmiyan
Daricha Haye Kheyal
Qitaat
Jaun Elia Ki Tamam Ghazlain (parts I-III)
Inshaye aur Mazaameen
Farnood
Is Rang Ke Tufaan اس رنگ کے طوفاںShayad Prose work (mainly translations) 
Elia was not just a poet but was also an editor and a translator, especially of old Sufi, Mutazili and Ismaili treatises. 
 Masih-i-Baghdad Hallaj, 
 Jometria, 
 Tawasin, 
 Isaghoji, 
 Rahaish-o-Kushaish, 
 Hasan bin Sabah 
 Farnod, Tajrid, 
 Masail-i-Tajrid, 
 Rasail Ikhwan al Safa 
Above are some of his translations from Arabic and Persian. Not only did he translate these books but also introduced several new words in the Urdu language.

 Politics 
Jaun Elia was a communist who, in his poems, supported communism in Pakistan. References to class consciousness are also seen in his poems. He also was described as "An anarchist, a nihilist, and a poet" by dunyanews.tv.

In media

In 2020, Punjabi rapper Kay Kap's album Rough Rhymes for Tough Times'' featured a song entitled "Bulaava" which had couplets from the poem 'Pehnaayi Ka Makaan' written & recited by Jaun Elia.

In 2023, urdu rapper Talha Anjum’s album “Open Letter” featured a song entitled “Secrets” which was strongly influenced by Jaun Elia’s poem “Be-dilli kya yuhin din guzar jaenge”. Talha Anjum’s other work is also greatly inspired by Jaun Elia’s poetry.

See also
 Rais Amrohvi

References

External links
 BBC Urdu's collection of writings on Jaun Elia 
 Jaun Elia sher/ghazal/nazm collection

1931 births
2002 deaths
Muhajir people
Pakistani poets
Pakistani scholars
Linguists of Urdu
Linguists from Pakistan
Pakistani literary critics
Urdu critics
Pakistani Shia Muslims
Poets from Karachi
Urdu-language theologians
20th-century Urdu-language writers
Urdu-language poets from Pakistan
20th-century poets
Indian emigrants to Pakistan
People from Amroha
Members of the Pakistan Philosophical Congress
20th-century linguists
20th-century Pakistani philosophers
Indian Communist poets
Pakistani Communist poets